Márton Dárdai (born 12 February 2002) is a German professional footballer who plays as a centre-back for Bundesliga club Hertha BSC.

Career
Dárdai began his youth career with Seeburger SV and 1. FC Wilmersdorf, before joining the youth academy of Hertha BSC in 2012. He made his professional debut for Hertha BSC in the Bundesliga on 7 November 2020, coming on as a substitute for Dedryck Boyata in the second minute of second-half stoppage time against FC Augsburg, which finished as a 3–0 away win.

Personal life
Dárdai is the son of Hungarian manager and former footballer Pál Dárdai, and the younger brother of MOL Fehérvár FC and Hungarian national team footballer Palkó Dárdai. Márton's grandfather was also a footballer and manager, and also named Pál Dárdai.

References

External links
 Profile at the Hertha BSC website
 
 

2002 births
Living people
Footballers from Berlin
German footballers
Germany youth international footballers
Germany under-21 international footballers
German people of Hungarian descent
Association football central defenders
Hertha BSC II players
Hertha BSC players
Bundesliga players
Regionalliga players